The Van—Sufian railway is a  long single track railway in eastern Turkey and western Iran. The railway begins at the Van Pier in Van, Turkey, on the eastern shore of Lake Van, and runs east to Sufian, Iran, where it connects to the Tabriz-Jolfa railway.

History

The oldest segment of the railway dates back to the early 20th century, during World War I, when a  branch railway was built from Sufian to Sharafkhaneh. 

The construction of a railway to Iran, via Van, was approved on 15 June 1937. The railway would continue east from Diyarbakır to Van and to the Iranian border at Kapıköy. Construction began shortly after and the railway reached Kurtalan in 1940. Due to the mountainous terrain between Kurtalan and Tatvan, the route was changed and its western starting became Elazığ. From Elazığ the railway would be built to Tatvan, via Muş, reaching Tuğ in 1964. A train ferry was established as a temporary means of transport between Tuğ and Van, as a bypass of Lake Van was planned. 

In the 1960s, Turkey and Iran came to an agreement to construct a railway from Van to Sharafkhaneh. 

CENTO sponsored a railway line, some of which was completed, to enable a rail connexion between London and Tehran via Van. The Van-Sufian railway from Lake Van in Turkey to Sharafkhaneh in Iran was completed and funded in large part by the Central Treaty Organisation (mainly the UK). The civil engineering was especially challenging because of the difficult terrain. Part of the route included a rail ferry across Lake Van with a terminal at Tatvan on the Western side of the lake.

The Van-Razi segment opened in 1971, while the Razi-Sharafkhaneh segment opened in 1977.

Operations
The railway is used primarily for freight rail, although the Iranian Railways operates passenger trains between Salmas and Sufian. The last passenger rail service in Turkey was suspended in July 2015, due to safety concerns regarding the Kurdish–Turkish conflict. Prior to suspension of passenger rail, the Trans-Asian Express used the railway between 2001 and 2015 on its journey from Istanbul, later Ankara, to Tehran. Other international trains were from Van to Tabriz and Damascus to Tehran. The latter was cancelled after the outbreak of the Syrian Civil War in 2011. A daily regional train also operated between Van and Özalp until 2015. The line is used mostly for through-traffic since freight rail facilities are minimal. The largest railyard along the route is in Van, adjacent to the city's railway station. Other small yards/sidings are located at Kapıköy and Razi.

References

Cross-border railway lines in Turkey
Railway lines in Iran
Standard gauge railways in Turkey
Transport in Van Province
Lake Van